Elizaveta Vyacheslavovna Malashenko (born 26 February 1996) is a Russian handballer for HC Astrakhanochka and the Russian national team.

International honours
EHF Cup:
Winner: 2014
EHF Cup Winners' Cup:
Finalist: 2016

References

External links

1996 births
Living people
Sportspeople from Tolyatti
Russian female handball players
Handball players at the 2014 Summer Youth Olympics